Lucas Matías Galán (born 22 June 1988) is an Argentine former footballer who played as a forward. A left-footed forward, Galán was known for his physical presence and heading.

Starting his career in Argentina, Galán moved to Guatemala in 2013, at Deportivo Coatepeque, helping them gain promotion to the Liga Nacional de Fútbol. Three months later he joined Greek side Kallithea, before moving to Lebanon in 2014, first at Salam Zgharta then at Ansar. Galán won the Golden Boot in both seasons in the Lebanese Premier League.

In 2016 he joined Saudi side Al-Tai, before returning to his native Argentina at Club Atlético Platense. In 2018 Galán ended his career in Lebanon at Shabab Arabi.

Early life
Galán was born on 22 June 1988 in Guaymallén, Mendoza, Argentina. He started his youth career at Leonardo Murialdo, before joining local club Godoy Cruz. Galán then joined the youth club Racing, playing alongside players such as Gabriel Mercado, Maximiliano Moralez, and Sergio Romero. He also had an experience at Universidad de Chile.

Club career
He then played for Juventud Alianza in 2009, and Atenas in 2010, before returning to Del Bono in 2011. Galán joined Atlético Policial in 2011, then  in 2012. 

Galán's first experience abroad was in 2013, at Deportivo Coatepeque in Guatemala. He helped his side gain promotion to the Liga Nacional de Fútbol, scoring six goals in 14 games. After six months in Guatemala, Galán signed for Football League Greece (second-tier) club Kallithea, where he made 22 appearances, scoring eight goals and assisting three.

On 10 September 2014, Galán signed for Lebanese Premier League side Salam Zgharta. With 17 league goals in 20 appearances, he won the 2014–15 Golden Boot. On 4 July 2015, Galán moved to Ansar on a two-year contract. For the second time in a row, Galán won the Lebanese Golden Boot, for the 2015–16 season, with 19 goals in 21 games. He was also included in the Lebanese Premier League Team of the Season.

In 2016 he moved to Al-Tai in Saudi Arabia, scoring six goals in 14 games, before moving back to Argentina in 2017, at Club Atlético Platense. In January 2018, Galán returned to Lebanon, signing for Shabab Arabi; he retired following an ACL injury.

Honours 
Deportivo Guaymallén
 : 2005

Deportivo Coatepeque
 Primera División de Ascenso: 2013

Individual
 Lebanese Premier League Team of the Season: 2015–16
 Lebanese Premier League top scorer: 2014–15, 2015–16

References

External links 

 
 
 

1988 births
Living people
Sportspeople from Mendoza, Argentina
Argentine footballers
Juventud Alianza players
Kallithea F.C. players
Salam Zgharta FC players
Al Ansar FC players
Al-Tai FC players
Al Shabab Al Arabi Club Beirut players
Club Atlético Platense footballers
Torneo Argentino A players
Torneo Argentino B players
Football League (Greece) players
Lebanese Premier League players
Saudi First Division League players
Primera B Metropolitana players
Argentine expatriate footballers
Argentine expatriate sportspeople in Guatemala
Argentine expatriate sportspeople in Greece
Argentine expatriate sportspeople in Lebanon
Argentine expatriate sportspeople in Saudi Arabia
Expatriate footballers in Guatemala
Expatriate footballers in Greece
Expatriate footballers in Lebanon
Expatriate footballers in Saudi Arabia
Lebanese Premier League top scorers
Association football forwards